WVGG (1440 AM) is a radio station licensed to Lucedale, Mississippi, United States.  The station airs a country music/Southern gospel format (simulcasting WRBE-FM 106.9 Lucedale) and is owned by JDL Corporation.

Previous logo

References

External links

WVGG's website

Country radio stations in the United States
Southern Gospel radio stations in the United States
Radio stations established in 1960
1960 establishments in Mississippi
VGG
VGG